George Lenthorn Flowers (29 March 1879 – 7 December 1958) was an Australian politician. He was born in Caveside, Tasmania. In 1942 he was elected to the Tasmanian Legislative Council as the Independent member for Westmorland. He was Chair of Committees from 1952 to 1957. He served in the Council until his death at Launceston in 1958.

References

1879 births
1958 deaths
Independent members of the Parliament of Tasmania
Members of the Tasmanian Legislative Council